The Soviet national youth football team was a special under-18 and under-20 football team of the Soviet Union designated specifically for FIFA World Youth Championship (today FIFA U-20 World Cup). It ceased to exist on the breakup of the Union.

The team was created in 1977 for the newly created FIFA competition for junior teams (among lads, under-18).

With dissolution of the Soviet Union, the Soviet Union youth football team competed at the 1992 UEFA European Under-18 Championship as the CIS youth under-18 football team which qualified for the 1993 FIFA World Youth Championship. That berth was passed over (grandfathered) to the Russia national under-20 football team.

FIFA World Youth Championship 

 Champions   Runners-up   Third place   Fourth place

*Denotes draws include knockout matches decided on penalty kicks.

1991 FIFA World Youth Championship
The last Soviet U-20 team
Head coach Gennadi Kostylev

Notes:
 All data through December 31, 1991.
 1992 transfers: Mandreko moved to Austria (Rapid Wien), Mamchur - Russia (Asmaral Moscow), Bushmanov changed team (CSKA Moscow), Scherbakov - Portugal (Sporting Lisbon), Novosadov changed team (KAMAZ Naberezhnye Chelny), Tumilovich changed team (Belarus Minsk).

See also 
 Soviet Union national football team
 Soviet Union national under-18 football team
 Soviet Union national under-16 football team
 FIFA U-20 World Cup
 UEFA European Under-19 Championship

External links
 FIFA Under-20 website Contains full results archive
 The Rec.Sport.Soccer Statistics Foundation Contains full record of U-20 Championships.

1977 establishments in the Soviet Union
1991 disestablishments in the Soviet Union
European national under-20 association football teams
Soviet Union national football team
Youth football in the Soviet Union